Nanne Dahlman (born 7 September 1970) is a retired Finnish professional tennis player, active in the 1990s.

She reached the third round of three grand slam tournaments:
 US Open 1992 (lost to Steffi Graf)
 Australian Open 1993 (lost to Nathalie Tauziat)
 Australian Open 1996 (lost to Lindsay Davenport)

She never won a WTA tournament, but she won 13 ITF tournaments.

ITF finals

Singles (7–3)

Doubles Finals (6-5)

References

1970 births
Living people
Finnish female tennis players
20th-century Finnish women
21st-century Finnish women